Robert Webber was an American actor.

Robert Webber may also refer to:

Robert E. Webber (1933–2007), American theologian
Rob Webber (born 1986), rugby union player

See also
Robert Weber (disambiguation)